Special Events Center may refer to:

The CFSB Center, an arena in Murray, Kentucky, United States, formerly known as the Regional Special Events Center
The Curtis Culwell Center, formerly known as the Garland Special Events Center, an arena and convention center in Garland, Texas, United States
The Don Haskins Center, an arena in El Paso, Texas, United States, known as the Special Events Center from 1976 to 1998
The Frank C. Erwin, Jr. Special Events Center, commonly known as the Frank Erwin Center, an arena in Austin, Texas, United States 
The Greensboro Coliseum Special Events Center, an exhibition center at the Greensboro Coliseum Complex in Greensboro, North Carolina, United States
The Jon M. Huntsman Center, an arena in Salt Lake City, Utah, United States, known as the Special Events Center from 1969 to 1987